The Monticello Confederate Monument stands at the end of the main entrance road to the Oaklawn Cemetery in Monticello, Arkansas. It was dedicated in 1915 to the Confederate soldiers of Drew County who served in the American Civil War. The main sculpture, which is made of marble, depicts a uniformed Confederate soldier carrying a blanket roll, and wearing a scabbard. He stands with both hands on a rifle, whose butt end is on the ground. It is inscribed as follows:
east side: CSA / TO THE / CONFEDERATE SOLDIERS / OF DREW COUNTY / 1861 - 1865
north side: ERECTED BY THE / W. F. SLEMONS CHAPTER / U. D. C. / 1914
south side, beneath a furled flag: FURL THAT BANNER! TRUE, / 'TIS GORY / YET, 'TIS WREATHED AROUND / WITH GLORY, / AND WILL LIVE IN SONG / AND STORY, / THOUGH IT'S FOLDS ARE IN THE DUST. / FATHER RYAN.
west side, beneath crossed sabers: LEST / WE / FORGET

The monument was listed on the National Register of Historic Places in 1996.

See also
National Register of Historic Places listings in Drew County, Arkansas

References

Cultural infrastructure completed in 1915
Buildings and structures in Drew County, Arkansas
Confederate States of America monuments and memorials in Arkansas
Monuments and memorials on the National Register of Historic Places in Arkansas
National Register of Historic Places in Drew County, Arkansas
Neoclassical architecture in Arkansas
1915 establishments in Arkansas